Duvalia caespitosa is a small succulent plant species, in the family Apocynaceae, widespread in South Africa.

Description
 
This species is recognised by its flower, which is held on a short stalk from the lower part of the stem. Like all Duvalia species, the D.caespitosa flower has five radiating corolla lobes (petals) that each have their sides folded down longitudinally. 

However, the lobes of D. caespitosa flowers are tightly folded, and therefore appear thin and spike-like. They are matte or sometimes slightly glossy. 

In D. caespitosa, the raised annulus in the centre of the flower is also very prominent, and is hairless or only very faintly pubescent. The annulus is usually a dark red-brown, but is yellow and spotted around the edge of the corona disc. 
The central corona disc is usually a dull red-brown, but can sometimes be pale. It is smaller than the annulus, revealing the top of latter around its circumference.

subsp. vestita 

Duvalia vestita is sometimes considered to be a subspecies of D. caespitosa. It has lobes that are slightly more spread out. The Corolla is noticeably hairy and very dark red (almost black).  

The distribution of vestita is in the far south of the D. caespitosa range - mainly in the western Overberg region, south of the Langeberg mountains. 

Duvalia vestita is rarely recorded from the Robertson Karoo and Breede River Valley. Here, it co-occurs with typical D.caespitosa and with Duvalia elegans, and tends to merge with the typical D. caespitosa. 

It also extends south into the western Overberg (Greyton, Bredasdorp, Wiesdrift, Struisbaai, Malgas), where it co-occurs with Duvalia elegans. (The typical hairless-flowered D. caespitosa does not occur in the Overberg)

References

Endemic flora of South Africa
caespitosa
Least concern plants